Gary David Robertson (born 12 April 1950 in Oamaru, Otago) is a former New Zealand rower who won an Olympic gold medal at the 1972 Summer Olympics in Munich.

He teamed with Dick Joyce, Wybo Veldman, John Hunter, Lindsay Wilson, Joe Earl, Trevor Coker and Tony Hurt and Simon Dickie (cox) to win the gold medal in the coxed eight. Robertson is one of only two New Zealand Olympic gold medallists who never won a national premier title. Robertson is the nephew of famed New Zealand rowing coach Rusty Robertson. His daughter, who is also a rower, married Olympic champion rower Eric Murray. The Robertsons lived in Australia for a while but returned to live in Cambridge, New Zealand when their daughter was pregnant.

Gary Robertson later worked as a full-time rowing coach in Christchurch. He now coaches at Waikato Diocesan School for Girls, previously Sydney Rowing Club.

References

External links
 

1950 births
Living people
New Zealand male rowers
Olympic gold medalists for New Zealand in rowing
Rowers at the 1972 Summer Olympics
Sportspeople from Oamaru
Medalists at the 1972 Summer Olympics
World Rowing Championships medalists for New Zealand
European Rowing Championships medalists